Blame is a 2010 Australian thriller drama film starring Damian De Montemas, Sophie Lowe, Kestie Morassi, Ashley Zukerman, Simon Stone and Mark Leonard Winter. It was directed by first time feature film director, Michael Henry. The film had a limited release in Australia on 16 June 2011.

Plot
A group of young vigilantes seeking revenge for a sexual betrayal fall far from grace. When the truth is out, they find themselves on the dark side of justice.

Music teacher Bernard (Damian De Montemas) is attacked at his home in isolated bushland by five young people masked and dressed in black. The group have just attended the funeral of Cate's (Kestie Morassi) sister Alice (Saskia Hampele), and they've come to kill Bernard, whom they blame for the girl's death as he had an affair with her when she was sixteen, and now, three years later she's taken her own life. Alice's boyfriend, Nick (Simon Stone), is the lead agitator; Alice's best friend, Natalie (Sophie Lowe), has persuaded her boyfriend, Anthony (Ashley Zukerman), to steal sleeping pills from his father's doctors surgery to make it look as though Bernard has committed suicide. It all however goes horribly wrong when their attempt fails and their victim fights for his life.

In the aftermath, questions are raised about the true nature of the events leading up to the botched attack. As lies and secrets are revealed, the dynamic of the once-tight group shifts as the friends begin to question each other's motives. As they move closer to the truth, the weight of their quest for justice drives them to a place of no return.

Cast
Damian De Montemas as Bernard
Sophie Lowe as Natalie
Kestie Morassi as Cate
Ashley Zukerman as Anthony
Simon Stone as Nick
Mark Leonard Winter as John
Saskia Hampele as Alice
Greg McNeill as Rodney
Rosie Sprenkels as Girl

Reception
On review aggregator Rotten Tomatoes, the film holds an approval rating of 58% based on 12 reviews, with an average rating of 5.47/10.
The film was screened and received accolades at Cannes Cinephiles, Melbourne International Film Festival, the 35th Toronto International Film Festival, the 47th Chicago International Film Festival, the Dublin International Film Festival and Buenos Aires International Film Festival of Independent Cinema.

Accolades

Filming locations
Filming occurred in the outer southeastern Perth suburb of Roleystone.

References

External links
 
 

2010 films
2010 directorial debut films
2010 drama films
2010 independent films
2010 thriller films
2010 thriller drama films
2010s vigilante films
Australian films about revenge
Australian independent films
Australian thriller drama films
Films set in Australia
Films shot in Perth, Western Australia
2010s English-language films